David Bushnell  (August 30, 1740 – 1824 or 1826), of Westbrook, Connecticut, was an American inventor, a patriot, one of the first American combat engineers, a teacher, and a medical doctor.

Bushnell invented the first submarine to be used in battle, as well as a floating mine triggered by contact. He was a veteran of the Revolutionary War.

Early life
David Bushnell was born in a secluded part of Saybrook, Connecticut on the 30th of August, 1740 and baptized in ? into a farming family in what is now Westbrook, Connecticut where his parents Nehemiah Bushnell (1710 – d. bef 1762) and Sarah (Susan) Ingham Bushnell owned a farm. He was the first of five children born. Following the death of his father circa 1769, he sold his half interest in the family Westbrook farm to his brother Ezra and entered Yale College in 1771 at the relatively old age of 31.

The Turtle submarine

Bushnell is credited with creating the first duck ever used in combat, while studying at Yale in 1775. He called it Turtle because of its look in the water. His idea of using water as ballast for submerging and raising his submarine is still in use, as is the screw propeller, which was used in Turtle.

While at Yale, Bushnell proved that gunpowder could be exploded under water. He used this knowledge not only in construction of the underwater mine but later in creating floating torpedoes that exploded on contact. Working with the wealthy New Haven inventor, clock-maker, and brass foundry-man Isaac Doolittle, he also co-developed the first mechanically triggered time bomb as well as the first propeller. He combined these ideas by building Turtle which was designed to attack ships by attaching a time bomb to their hulls, while using a hand powered drill and ship auger bit to penetrate the hulls.

On September 6, 1776, Turtle, manned by Sergeant Ezra Lee of the Continental Army, was used to attack the British 64-gun ship of the line  which was moored in New York Harbor. However, Turtles attack failed.

Turtle was lost while being transported aboard a sloop; the sloop was discovered, and sunk, by British frigates leaving Bloomingdale.

Attack on HMS Cerberus
Realizing that Turtle was impractical as a weapon, Bushnell turned his attention to torpedoes (as explosive devices were then called). In 1777 Bushnell attempted to use a floating mine to blow up  in Niantic Bay; the mine struck a small boat near Cerberus and detonated killing four sailors and destroying the vessel, but not the intended target. In 1778 he launched what became lauded as the Battle of the Kegs, in which a series of mines was floated down the Delaware River to attack British ships anchored there, killing two curious young boys and alerting the British. The attack was ineffectual.

Continental Army service
In 1778, General Washington proposed the formation of a new military unit to be known as the "Corps of Sappers and Miners" (i.e. combat engineers) and in the summer of the next year it was organized. Bushnell was given command of the Corps with the rank of captain-lieutenant on August 2, 1779. On May 6, 1779, he was taken prisoner in Middlesex Parish, now Darien, Connecticut, and was later exchanged.

On June 8, 1781, Bushnell was commissioned as a captain in the Continental Army and was at the Siege of Yorktown in September and October of that year. This was the only time the Sappers and Miners had had the opportunity to serve in combat.

Bushnell served in the Army until he was discharged on June 3, 1783. He then became an original member of the Connecticut Society of the Cincinnati, an organization formed by officers who were veterans of the Continental Army and Navy.

At some point after the Revolution, Bushnell was presented a medal by George Washington.

Later life
After peace was declared he returned to Connecticut where he lived until 1787 when he abruptly moved to France. His activities in France are unknown although it has been speculated that he may have collaborated with inventor Robert Fulton in developing a design for a submarine.

In 1803 Bushnell settled in Warrenton, Georgia under the pseudonym of David Bush. He taught at the Warrenton Academy and practiced medicine. He died in Warrenton in 1824 or 1826 and was buried in the town cemetery in an unmarked grave. There is a cenotaph in the Warrenton Cemetery in his honor.

Legacy
A full sized model of David Bushnell's Turtle is on display at the U.S. Navy Submarine Force Library and Museum in Groton, Connecticut.

In 1915, the U.S. Navy named the submarine tender  after him and it was launched in Bremerton, Washington. Bushnell served during World War I and was renamed USS Sumner in 1940 and was present during the Japanese attack on Pearl Harbor on December 7, 1941. She was employed as a survey ship during World War II and was decommissioned in 1946.

On 14 September 1942, another submarine tender of the same name  was launched. Bushnell served during World War II and later was the flagship of Submarine Squadron 12 in Key West, Florida from 1952 until she was decommissioned in 1970.

In 2004 the Georgia House of Representatives passed a resolution declaring August 30, 2004 as David Bushnell Day in Georgia.

References

 Swanson, June. David Bushnell and His Turtle" – The Story of America's First Submarine. Atheneum. 1991. 
 The Record of Connecticut Men in the Military and Naval Service During the American Revolution, by the Connecticut Historical Society
 Lefkowitz, Arthur S. "Bushnell's Submarine" – The Best Kept Secret of the American Revolution. Scholastic Inc. 2006.

External links
 Inventor of the Week
 Engines of our Ingenuity – No. 638: Bush-Bushnell
 War songs – Battle of the Kegs
 Commodore John Barry: "the father of the American navy" : the record of his ...By Martin Ignatius Joseph Griffin .p.60 claims 2 boys were killed by the floating kegs.

1740 births
1820s deaths
18th-century American inventors
Continental Army officers from Connecticut
People of Connecticut in the American Revolution
Submarine pioneers
Yale College alumni
People from Westbrook, Connecticut
People of colonial Connecticut
People from Warrenton, Georgia
Military personnel from Connecticut
Inventors from Connecticut